Dubai Sports is a 24/7 sports channel based in Dubai, United Arab Emirates. The channel started in 1998 to be the home for sports news around the country and was awarded the privilege of showing different sports events locally and worldwide. It is one of the channels of Dubai Media Incorporated.

Channels

 Dubai Sports 1
 Dubai Sports 2
 Dubai Sports 3
 Dubai Racing 1
 Dubai Racing 2
 Dubai Racing 3

Sporting events

 DFB Pokal
 UAE Pro League
 CEV
 GDF Suez
 FINA
 Dubai Tennis Championships
 DP World Tour Championship, Dubai
 Dubai Desert Triathlon
Arabian Gulf Cup
I-League
Japanese J-League

External links
 Official website

Sports television networks
Television stations in the United Arab Emirates
Sports television in the United Arab Emirates
Television channels and stations established in 1998
Mass media in Dubai